Ernest Wilson may refer to:

Ernest Henry Wilson (1876–1930), English botanist, best known as E. H. Wilson
Ernest J. Wilson III (born c. 1948), American academic and research scholar
Ernest Wilson (English cricketer) (1907–1981), English cricketer
Ernest Wilson (New Zealand cricketer) (1877–1959), New Zealand cricketer
Ernest Wilson (singer) (1951–2021), Jamaican reggae singer
Ernest C. Wilson Jr. (1924–1992), American architect and real estate developer
Ernie Wilson (1900–1982), Australian rules footballer
Ernie Wilson (English footballer) (1899–1955), English footballer, Brighton & Hove Albion appearance record-holder
No I.D. (born 1971), hip hop and R&B producer also known as Ernest Wilson

See also
Wilson (name)